Lorcan Redmond (born 26 October 1930) is an Irish former Gaelic football player and selector. As a player he lined out with St Margaret's and the Wicklow senior football team before later enjoying success as a selector with the Dublin senior football team.

Playing career

Redmond spent over 30 years playing with the St Margaret's club in north County Dublin. After beginning in the juvenile and underage grades, he continued to line out for the club into his forties. At inter-county level, Redmond won two O'Byrne Cup titles with the Wicklow senior football team.

Management career

Redmond, alongside Donal Colfer, became a selector under the management of Kevin Heffernan with the Dublin senior football team in 1973. It was a triumvirate that yielded four All-Ireland Championships over the course of the following decade. Redmond's tenure as a selector, which ended in 1986, also saw Dublin win nine Leinster Championships and two National Football League titles. He returned as a selector under Mickey Whelan in 1995 and later served as manager of the Dublin under-21 team.

Honours

Player

Wicklow
O'Byrne Cup: 1955, 1957

Selector

Dublin
All-Ireland Senior Football Championship: 1974, 1976, 1977, 1983
Leinster Senior Football Championship: 1974, 1975, 1976, 1977, 1978, 1979, 1983, 1984, 1985
National Football League: 1975–76, 1977–78

References

1930 births
Living people
Wicklow inter-county Gaelic footballers
Gaelic football selectors